The Taiwan Provincial Government was the government that governed Taiwan Province of the Republic of China. Its functions have been transferred to the National Development Council and other ministries of the Executive Yuan.

History 

At the end of World War II, Japan surrendered on August 15, 1945. The Nationalist government started the process to takeover Taiwan on behalf of the Allies. The Taiwan Provincial Administrative Office was established by the Executive Yuan in Chungking on September 1, 1945. The office moved to Taipei on October 25, 1945. After the February 28 incident in 1947, the Executive Yuan decided to restructure the Provincial Administrative Office as a provincial government. On May 16, 1947, the Taiwan Provincial Government was established.

As the Republic of China progressively lost control of mainland China to Communist Party forces in the late 1940s and early 1950s, the national government relocated to Taiwan in late 1949. However, Taiwan continued to be governed by a provincial government even though from 1955 it was one of only two provincial governments still functioning (the other being Fujian province, controlling some islands off the mainland coast). The remainder of Fujian province still under Republic of China control was placed under military administration in 1956, and its provincial government was downsized and relocated to Taiwan island. This left Taiwan province as the only fully functioning provincial government. From 1967, a number of major cities in Taiwan were elevated to special municipalities directly controlled by the national government, and moved outside the jurisdiction of Taiwan province.

During the constitutional reform initiated in 1996, the ROC authorities decided to downsize the provincial structure due to the reasons that to solve the problem of overlapping personnel and administrative resources between the provincial and central governments, and cut excessive public spending. The provinces were streamlined and ceased to be self-governing bodies in December 1998, with their administrative functions transferred to the National Development Council and other ministries of the Executive Yuan as well as second-tier local governments such as counties. However, the position of the Chairman of the Provincial Government and Taiwan Provincial Consultative Council are retained to comply with the Constitution.

In July 2018, all provincial governmental organs were formally abolished, with budget and personnel removed.

Historical government buildings 
Historically, before the provincial government's duties and functions were handed to the Executive Yuan in July 2018, the provincial government was located in Taipei from 1947 to 1956, and in Zhongxing New Village from 1957 to July 2018.

Governor of Taiwan

Official titles of the governor

List of governors
All governors of Taiwan Province are codified in Chapter XI, Article 113, Section 2 of the constitution.

Timeline

See also 
 Taiwan Provincial Consultative Council
 Fujian Provincial Government

References

External links 
 

1947 establishments in Taiwan
2018 disestablishments in Taiwan
Defunct organizations based in Taiwan
Government agencies disestablished in 2018
Local governments of the Republic of China